Blast furnace gas (BFG) is a by-product of blast furnaces that is generated when the iron ore is reduced with coke to metallic iron. It has a very low heating value, about 93 BTU/cubic foot (3.5 MJ/m3), because it consists of about 51 vol% nitrogen and 22 vol% carbon dioxide, which are not flammable. The rest amounts to around 22 vol% carbon monoxide, which has a fairly low heating value already and 5 vol% hydrogen. Per ton of steel produced via the blast furnace route, 2.5 to 3.5 ton of blast furnace gas is produced. It is commonly used as a fuel within the steel works, but it can be used in boilers and power plants equipped to burn it. It may be combined with natural gas or coke oven gas before combustion or a flame support with richer gas or oil is provided to sustain combustion. Particulate matter is removed so that it can be burned more cleanly. Blast furnace gas is sometimes flared without generating heat or electricity.

This pressure is utilized to operate a generator (Top-gas-pressure Recovery Turbine - i.e. TRT in short), which can generate electrical energy up to 35 kWh/t of pig iron without burning any fuel. Dry type TRTs can generate more power than wet type TRT.

Auto ignition point of blast furnace gas is approximate  and it has LEL (Lower Explosive Limit) of 27% & UEL (Upper Explosive Limit) of 75% in an air-gas mixture at normal temperature and pressure.

The high concentration of carbon monoxide makes the gas hazardous.

See also
Coal-bed methane
Exhaust gas
Flue gas
Fuel gas
History of manufactured gas

Sources

International Energy Agency

Fuel gas
Industrial gases
Synthetic fuel technologies